Jamal Abdul Latif Saleh Al Shobaki, (Born on 1952 in the city of Idhna) is a Palestinian politician, diplomat and member of Fatah.

Life 
Al-Shobaki was born in the town of Idhna in the Hebron Governorate during the Jordanian annexation of the West Bank to a Palestinian family who immigrated from the village of Beit Jibreen (destroyed during the 1948 war) in the Hebron district. He holds a BA in Geography from Beirut Arab University.

In 1996, Shobaki won 24,346 votes in the Palestinian general elections, he became a member of the Palestinian Legislative Council.

He was appointed Minister of Local Government in Palestinian Authority Government of April 2003.

He was the Minister of Youth and Sports and Local Government in Palestinian Authority Government of October 2003.

He was appointed Minister of Local Government in Palestinian Authority Government of November 2003.

He was a member of the Palestinian Revolutionary Council between 2009 and 2016.

Al-Shobaki was ambassador to Saudi Arabia between 2006 and 2013, and he was also ambassador to Egypt between 2014 and 2017.

He was appointed ambassador of the State of Palestine to Morocco. On 26 January 2018, he presented his official credentials to the Moroccan King Mohammed VI.

See also 
 Palestine-Morocco relations
 Embassy of the State of Palestine in Morocco

References 

Fatah members
1952 births
Ambassadors of the State of Palestine to Morocco
https://www.nytimes.com/2003/01/01/world/palestinian-seeks-reform-by-following-the-money.html
Members of the Palestinian Central Council
Palestinian Sunni Muslims
Palestinian diplomats
Palestinian refugees
Ambassadors of the State of Palestine to Egypt
Ambassadors of the State of Palestine to Saudi Arabia
Members of the 1996 Palestinian Legislative Council
Beirut Arab University alumni
People from Hebron Governorate
Living people